Crocinitomix is a genus in the phylum Bacteroidota (Bacteria).

Etymology
The name Crocinitomix means saffron-coloured thread, derived from the Latin adjective crocinus, of or pertaining to saffron and tomix, a string or thread.

Species
The genus contains the species Crocinitomix algicola and C. catalasitica. C. catalasitica Bowman et al., 2003 is the type species of the genus. Its name derives from the New Latin catalasum, meaning catalase, and Latin -tica, a suffix used in adjectives with the sense of relating to, pertaining to the ability of this species to produce catalase.

References

Bacteria genera
Flavobacteria